45 Cancri is a binary star system in the zodiac constellation of Cancer, located 680 light-years away from the Sun. It has the Bayer designation A1 Cancri; 45 Cancri is the Flamsteed designation. It is visible to the naked eye as a faint, white-hued star at an apparent visual magnitude of 5.62. They are drifting closer to the Earth with a heliocentric radial velocity of −6 km/s.

The primary, designated component A, is an aging giant star with a stellar classification of G8 III, but has most likely not yet made multiple ascents up the red giant branch. It has 3.11 times the mass of the Sun and has expanded to 14 times the Sun's radius. The less evolved secondary, component B is likewise a giant star, having a class of A3 III. It has three times the mass of the Sun and shines with 191 times the Sun's luminosity.

References

A-type giants
G-type giants
Binary stars

Cancer (constellation)
Cancri, A1
BD+13 1972
Cancri, 45
074288
042795
3450